De Lyckliga Kompisarna (Swedish for ’The Happy Friends’), DLK, is a Swedish melodious punk band. The band was formed in 1989, split up in 1997, and re-united in 2008. They are probably best known for their song "Ishockeyfrisyr", which is also known as "Hockeyfrilla" (Swedish for "mullet"). They also made a music video for it.

The band is headed by Mart Hällgren who both wrote songs, sang and played several instruments. DLK split up after two farewell gigs at Kafé 44 in Stockholm, Sweden. These gigs were recorded and compiled into a live album. After DLK, Martin Hällgren began a solo career as "Mart" (he had previously played solo in the band Total Egon), but later started the band UBBA.

De Lyckliga Kompisarna stated in January 2008 that they would begin playing again, and the band has since gone on tour and released a new EP.

Members
 Mart Hällgren (vocals and bass)
 Jouni Haapala (drums)
 Fredrik Åberg (guitar and backup vocals)
 Roger Reinstam (guitar and backup vocals)

Former members
 Daniel Levin
 Joakim Levin
 Sussie Persson
 Björn Gunér
 Egil Jansson
 Christoffer Roth
 Daniel Peda
 Anders Fransson
 Mattias Ander

Discography

Album
1991 – Le som en fotomodell
1993 – Tomat
1995 – Sagoland
1996 – DLK
1997 – Live på Kafé 44 (Live)
2000 – Hockeyfrillor 89-97 (Samling)
2009 – Hugos Sång (EP)
2010 - Hugos Sång LP
2013 - De Motvilliga Konstnärerna
2016 - Bara Tiden Är Ny

Single
1990 – "Scaniajon"
1990 – "Dit kuken pekar"
1994 – "Dammsugarförsäljare Blues"
1994 – "8"
1995 – "Tillbaka till sagolandet"
1996 – "Borlänge"

References

External links

Official homepage
Official homepage from the record company

Swedish punk rock groups
Musical groups established in 1989